The Distance to Here is the fifth studio album by the band Live, released in 1999. It debuted at #4 on the Billboard 200, selling 138,000 copies in its first week and was certified Platinum by the RIAA on November 19, 1999.

Track listing

Personnel
Live
Ed Kowalczyk – lead vocals, rhythm guitar
Chad Taylor – lead guitar, backing vocals
Patrick Dahlheimer – bass
Chad Gracey – drums

Additional musicians
Jerry Harrison – keyboards
Adam Kowalczyk – rhythm guitar
Michael "Railo" Railton – keyboards
Christopher Thorn – rhythm guitar, slide guitar on "Face and Ghost" and "Dance with You"

Charts

Weekly charts

Year-end charts

Singles

A: "Run to the Water" did not chart on the Flemish Ultratop 50, but peaked at number 17 on the Ultratip chart.

Certifications

References

1999 albums
Albums produced by Jerry Harrison
Albums with cover art by Stefan Sagmeister
Live (band) albums
Radioactive Records albums